Lima Stadium, built in the 1930s, is a historic stadium in Lima, Ohio. It was listed on the National Register of Historic Places in 2002.  Its significance is listed as its architecture. Its historic and current use is a sports facility.  It is the only high school stadium in Ohio to be recognized as a historic landmark.  Currently it is the stadium of the Lima Senior Spartans, the Lima Central Catholic Thunderbirds, and the Lima Warriors.

References 

Buildings and structures in Lima, Ohio
Sports venues in Ohio
School buildings on the National Register of Historic Places in Ohio
National Register of Historic Places in Allen County, Ohio
Sports venues on the National Register of Historic Places in Ohio